The Daniel and Nellie Byrns House is located in Lodi, Wisconsin. It was added to the National Register of Historic Places in 2008.

History
The house was built in 1915. Daniel Byrns was listed as a grocer in a 1913 state business directory.

References

Houses on the National Register of Historic Places in Wisconsin
Houses in Columbia County, Wisconsin
Houses completed in 1915
Lodi, Wisconsin
National Register of Historic Places in Columbia County, Wisconsin
Bungalow architecture in Wisconsin